Saint Cronan was a 6th-century Irish Saint, and founder of monasteries.

Cronan is the founder of Inchicronan Priory and Patron of the towns of Tuamgraney and Roscrea.
St. Cronan's Church, Tuamgraney is one claimant for the oldest continuously used building in Ireland.

References

6th-century Christian saints
Year of birth unknown
6th-century births
Year of death unknown